Karak District is a district in Kohat Division of Khyber Pakhtunkhwa province in Pakistan. It is situated to the south of Kohat District and on the north side of Bannu and Lakki Marwat districts on the main Indus Highway between Peshawar and Karachi – it is 131 km from the provincial capital Peshawar. It gained a district status in 1982, prior to which it was part of Kohat District.

It is natively inhabited by the Khattak Pashtun tribe who make the majority of the population.

Demographics
At the time of the 2017 census the district had a population of 705,362, of which 348,315 were males and 357,004 females. Rural population was 654,276 (92.76%) while the urban population was 51,086 (7.24%). The literacy rate was 63.75% - the male literacy rate was 84.37% while the female literacy rate was 44.41%. 285 people in the district were from religious minorities. Pashto was the predominant language, spoken by 99.16% of the population.

Resources 
There are several natural resources that have been discovered in Karak.  The salt mines were well known in antiquity and a major source of salt for the Indian subcontinent into British imperial times.  More recently oil, gas, and uranium have all been discovered. Oil and gas reservoirs have been found in the towns of Makori, Noshpa Banda, Gurguri and Lachi circle.

Oil and gas reservoirs explored in Karak district are producing 7000 barrels of oil and 2500 cubic feet gas on a daily basis which is a record production from one oil well in the country. The oil and gas reservoirs at Noshapa Banda in district Karak are generating millions of rupees revenue daily. District Karak is blessed with mineral resources and many national and international companies and OGDCL are busy in oil and gas exploration in different areas of the district. Vast reservoirs of oil and gas have been explored in Gurguri and Noshpa Banda areas of the district so far whereas exploration is under way in other areas.

According to a serve conducted by International Nuclear Information System
 where Fission Track Technique has been applied for the estimation of uranium in 30 drinking water sources of Tehsil Takht-e-Nasrati ,Shnawa Gudi khill and District Karak, Kpk, Pakistan. These samples have mean, minimum and maximum concentration of uranium of 13.45 +- 3.207, 1.07 +- 0.6, 84.23 +- 15.63 micro g l/sup -1/, respectively. The significant finding was the observation of very high level of uranium in drinking water sources obtained from uranium rich bedrocks than the safe limit of WHO (15 micro g l/sup -1/) for human consumption. On the basis of this study, it was concluded that the origin of uranium is potentially due to one of the Asia richest mineral deposit of uranium in Karak, Pakistan. The results could be of vital concern in diagnosis and prognosis of uranium induced disease in the local population under investigation.

Provincial Assembly

Administrative divisions
The district of Karak is administratively subdivided into three Tehsils.
 Banda Daud Shah
 Karak
 Takht-e-Nasrati

Neighboring areas
Kohat
Bannu
Waziristan
Hangu District
Lakki Marwat

See also
 Khushal Khan Khattak University
 2020 Karak temple attack

References

 
Districts of Khyber Pakhtunkhwa